Khalid al Temawi (born 19 April 1969) is a retired Saudi Arabian footballer.

Al Temawi made several appearances for the Saudi Arabia national football team, including playing in 13 qualifying matches for the 1994 and 1998 FIFA World Cups, as well as three matches at the 1997 FIFA Confederations Cup. He also played at the 1996 AFC Asian Cup, where Saudi Arabia became champions.

References

1969 births
Living people
People from Ha'il
Saudi Arabian footballers
Saudi Arabia international footballers
1996 AFC Asian Cup players
1997 FIFA Confederations Cup players
AFC Asian Cup-winning players
Al Hilal SFC players
Saudi Professional League players
Association football midfielders
Footballers at the 1990 Asian Games
Asian Games competitors for Saudi Arabia
20th-century Saudi Arabian people
21st-century Saudi Arabian people